A Dog's Journey is a 2019 American family comedy-drama film directed by Gail Mancuso in her feature film directorial debut and written by W. Bruce Cameron, Cathryn Michon, Maya Forbes, and Wally Wolodarsky. The film is based on the 2012 novel of the same name by Cameron and is the sequel to the 2017 film A Dog's Purpose. The film stars Josh Gad, Dennis Quaid, Marg Helgenberger, Betty Gilpin, Kathryn Prescott, and Henry Lau.

The film is a co-production between Amblin Entertainment, Reliance Entertainment, Walden Media, and Alibaba Pictures and was released by Universal Pictures in the United States on May 17, 2019.

Plot

In the previous film, Bailey reunited with his longtime owner Ethan after being reincarnated as a new dog. Now a St. Bernard/Australian Shepherd, Bailey lives happily with Ethan, Ethan's wife Hannah, Gloria (the widow of Hannah's son Henry) and her 2-year-old daughter CJ on their farm in Michigan. Gloria is an inattentive mother, hates dogs, has a strained relationship with her parents-in-law and an ambition to be a singer. Gloria's suspicious nature leads her to move out with CJ. Shortly after, Ethan discovers a tumor in Bailey's stomach. Before Bailey is euthanized, Ethan lovingly holds him and asks him to take care of CJ once he is reincarnated again. Bailey is then shown running through a grassy field towards CJ.

Nine years later, Bailey, reincarnated as a female beagle named Molly, sees a now 11-year-old CJ with her best friend Trent and his parents, who are adopting the former’s favorite brother Rocky. Remembering the promise she made to Ethan in her previous life, Molly runs outside to CJ. CJ secretly adopts Molly and keeps her hidden from Gloria for several weeks, until Gloria eventually discovers her. Gloria scolds CJ, but reluctantly allows her to keep Molly to compensate for her neglectful parenting.

CJ and Molly grow increasingly close over the years, along with Trent and Rocky. Now a teenager, CJ tells Trent she wants to drop out of high school and move to New York City with her deceased father Henry's insurance settlement to become a musician. CJ begins to date Shane, who Molly distrusts and tries to protect her from. Attending a party which gets busted by police for underage drinking, CJ is sentenced to community service where Molly learns how to detect cancer. Her grandparents try to pay her and Gloria a visit, bringing a box of Henry's belongings, but still angry and distrustful, Gloria closes the door on them. During the exchange, Molly subtly indicates to Ethan that she is the reincarnated Bailey.

Days after she had broken up with him, Shane assaults CJ, prompting Molly to bite him. While drunk, Gloria responds nonchalantly to CJ's distress and also reveals she spent all of Henry's settlement money (meant for CJ) on designer clothes, wine, her house, and a BMW, prompting CJ to leave town in the car with Molly. On the way out, they are stalked and tail-ended by Shane, which causes her car to flip, killing Molly. Shane flees the scene in a panic to avoid his arrest. Molly is then shown running through the same grassy field that Bailey had run through when he died.

Molly is reincarnated as a male English mastiff named Big Dog, who lives with a convenience store owner in Pennsylvania. One day, CJ visits the shop on her way to New York City and is lovingly greeted by Big Dog. He mistakenly believes that CJ recognizes him and is going to take him with her, but is heartbroken when CJ leaves the store without him.

Big Dog is reincarnated as a male Biewer Terrier named Max, who is at an adoption event in New York. Max avoids adoption by being hostile to most other humans, in hopes of encountering CJ again. He eventually spots CJ across a city block and chases her into a building, and when CJ returns Max to the adoption event, she feels compelled to adopt him when she's told that Max would otherwise be put down. While CJ is working as a dog walker and returning a client's dog, Max detects Trent's familiar scent down the hall and pulls her toward his door. While CJ and Trent greet and reconnect with each other, Max sniffs around Trent's apartment and is sad to learn that Rocky has died.

Max is eager to reunite CJ and Trent, despite each of them being in live-in relationships of their own. Max intentionally misbehaves around CJ's boyfriend, after which they break up and CJ moves out with Max. They stay with various friends of CJ's before Max spots Trent and his girlfriend on the street, and Trent offers his guest room to CJ upon learning that she's without a permanent residence. Remembering how to diagnose cancer during his life as Molly, Max signals to CJ that he detects it on Trent and CJ urges Trent to see a doctor. The doctor confirms, and Trent begins chemo. His girlfriend shallowly leaves him, so CJ becomes his primary caretaker. Once Trent is cancer-free, he urges CJ to accept a meeting with Gloria, who was at the time 9 months and 13 days sober. Now having warmed up to dogs, Gloria tearfully apologizes to CJ for her abusive nature, and gives CJ some of the things sent from Ethan and Hannah (letters from Henry that he had written while she was pregnant with CJ). They inspire CJ to write more songs and lead to her finally perform, overcoming her longstanding stage fright and beginning her musical career.

Trent encourages CJ to go on a road trip with him and Max to her grandparents’ farm, where she reunites with Ethan and Hannah for the first time since she was a toddler. Ethan recognizes Max as Bailey and tells CJ of the dog's reincarnations, proving it by having Max perform a trick with Ethan that only Bailey would know. CJ then realizes that Bailey, Molly, Big Dog, and Max were all the same dog and runs to tell Trent. CJ and Trent then confess their love for one another, kiss, and praise Max/Bailey for reuniting and protecting them.

CJ and Trent marry, and shortly after CJ releases her first music album, they have a son named Saint. Gloria reconciles with her daughter and in-laws, reuniting the entire family. Ethan dies of natural causes, surrounded by Max and the rest of his family. Max later ages and dies as well, while being comforted by CJ. The final scene shows Bailey running through the grassy field, morphing backwards through his previous incarnations, before crossing the Rainbow Bridge and reuniting with Ethan in heaven.

Cast 
 Josh Gad as the voice of Bailey, Molly, Big Dog and Max, the different incarnations of “Boss Dog”.
 Dennis Quaid as Ethan Montgomery, Gloria's father-in-law, Hannah's husband, Bailey's owner and CJ's grandfather.
 Marg Helgenberger as Hannah Montgomery, Ethan's wife and CJ's grandmother. Helgenberger replaces Peggy Lipton from the first film.
 Betty Gilpin as Gloria Mitchell, Ethan and Hannah's daughter-in-law and CJ's neglectful and emotionally abusive mother.
 Kathryn Prescott as Clarity June "CJ" Montgomery, Gloria's daughter, Trent's love interest, Ethan and Hannah's granddaughter, and Saint's mother.
 Abby Ryder Fortson as Young CJ
 Emma Volk as Toddler CJ
 Henry Lau as Trent, CJ's best friend and love interest and Saint's father.
 Ian Chen as Young Trent
 Jake Manley as Shane, a criminal Mr. Sub employee who temporarily dates CJ, and later unknowingly and indirectly kills Molly.
 Johnny Galecki as Henry Montgomery, Hannah and Ethan's deceased son, Gloria's late husband and CJ's late father.
 Beckett Richard Pin as Saint, CJ and Trent's infant son who appears at the end of the film.
 Tyler Asher Xin-Qin as Newborn Saint
 Bruce as Bailey
 Elle, Rosebud, Diane, Rydel, and Lemy as Molly 
 Scott as Big Dog 
 Belle as Max

Production
On June 21, 2017, CEO of Amblin Entertainment Michael Wright announced that a sequel to the film A Dog's Purpose was in development.

On August 26, 2018, Universal Pictures began production on the sequel.

Principal photography began in August 2018.

Release 
The film was released by Universal Pictures on May 17, 2019. It was released by Entertainment One in foreign territories, where actor Peter Baykov is the voice of Trent for international release.

Home media  
A Dog's Journey was released on digital on 6 August and Blu-ray, DVD and on-demand on 20 August from Universal Pictures Home Entertainment.

Blu-ray Bonus Features Include:
 Deleted and Extended Scenes
 Gag Reel
 A DOG'S Sequel, New and returning cast members discuss their roles in A Dog's Journey and share their appreciation for director Gail Mancuso.
 Everyone's Best Friend.
 Sit down with the cast to hear about their life-long love of man's best friend.
 Working with Dogs - Cast and crew share the joys of working with animal-actors.
 A Healing Journey - Josh Gad, Dennis Quaid and others discuss the bond between dogs and humans.
 Scoring the JOURNEY - Director Gail Mancuso and composer Mark Isham discuss the music in the film.
 Feature Commentary with Director Gail Mancuso

Reception

Box office
A Dog's Journey grossed $22.7 million in the United States and Canada, and $52.8 million in other territories, for a worldwide total of $75.6 million.

In the United States and Canada, the film was released alongside John Wick: Chapter 3 – Parabellum and The Sun Is Also a Star, and was projected to gross $10–14 million from 3,267 theaters in its opening weekend. It ended up debuting to just $8 million, the lowest opening of any of W. Bruce Cameron's Dog films. In its second weekend the film made $4.1 million, finishing seventh, and then $1 million in its third.

Critical response
The website's critical consensus reads: "A Dog's Journey is as sentimental as one might expect, but even cynical viewers may find their ability to resist shedding a tear stretched to the  limit." Metacritic, which uses a weighted average, assigned the film a score of 43 out of 100, based on 16 critics, indicating "mixed or average reviews". Audiences polled by CinemaScore gave the film an average grade of "A" on an A+ to F scale, the same as its predecessor, while those at PostTrak gave it 3.5 out of 5 stars.

References

External links 

 

2019 films
Amblin Entertainment films
Reliance Entertainment films
Universal Pictures films
Walden Media films
Films about reincarnation
Films about child abuse
Films about dogs
Films based on American novels
Films about pets
American sequel films
2019 directorial debut films
Films scored by Mark Isham
2010s English-language films